The 1988 Athens Trophy was a women's tennis tournament played on outdoor clay courts at the Athens Lawn Tennis Club in Athens, Greece and was part of Tier V of the 1988 WTA Tour. It was the third edition of the tournament and was held from 1 August until 7 August 1988. First-seeded Isabel Cueto won the singles title and earned $12,000 first-prize money.

Finals

Singles

 Isabel Cueto defeated  Laura Golarsa 6–0, 6–1
 It was Cueto's 2nd title of the year and the 3rd of her career.

Doubles

 Sabrina Goleš /  Judith Wiesner defeated  Silke Frankl /  Sabine Hack 7–5, 6–0
 It was Goleš' only title of the year and the 3rd of her career. It was Wiesner's 2nd title of the year and the 3rd of her career.

See also
 1988 Athens Open – men's tournament

External links
 ITF tournament edition details
 Tournament draws

Athens Trophy
Athens Trophy
Athens Trophy